Santhanam or Santanam is an Indian name that may refer to:

People 
 K. Santhanam (1895–1980), Indian politician
 Madabusi Santanam Raghunathan (born 1941), Indian mathematician
 Maharajapuram Santhanam (1928–1992), Carnatic music vocalist
 M. R. Santhanam, Indian actor and producer
 N. Santhanam (born 1980), Indian actor and comedian
 Srini Santhanam (born 1984), Indian-American cricketer
 T. Santhanam (c. 1970–2022), Indian art director
 Vaidhyanathaswamy Santhanam (born 1925), Indian cotton scientist

Other uses 
 Santhanam (film), a 1955 Telugu-language film